Johannes Paabusk (also Johannes Pabusk; 9 July 1891, Kureküla – ?) was an Estonian politician. He was a member of Estonian National Assembly. He was arrested by Soviet authorities on 14 November 1945. His fate is unknown.

References

1891 births
Members of the Estonian National Assembly
Year of death missing
People who died in the Gulag
Estonian people who died in Soviet detention
People from Elva Parish